Paul Olden (born 1954) is the current public address announcer for the New York Yankees at Yankee Stadium. He has been the announcer since the Yankees moved to their new ballpark in 2009.

Early life and career
Born in Chicago, Olden moved with his family to Los Angeles as a child. He attended Dorsey High School and Los Angeles City College. Olden was formerly a radio and television play-by-play announcer for the Yankees, Tampa Bay Devil Rays, California Angels, Cleveland Indians, Philadelphia Eagles, UCLA Bruins, Los Angeles Rams, New York Jets, New Jersey Nets, and ESPN.

Olden was the target of Los Angeles Dodgers manager Tommy Lasorda's infamous and profanity laden  "Dave Kingman tirade" in 1978, in which Lasorda ranted at Olden (who worked at Los Angeles radio station KLAC at the time) when he asked him about Kingman having hit three home runs against the Dodgers that day. He was also the PA announcer for 13 consecutive Super Bowls from 1993 to 2005.

New York Yankees
Olden replaced Jim Hall, the successor to Bob Sheppard, who had been the Yankees announcer since 1951.

References

1953 births
Living people
African-American sports journalists
California Angels announcers
Cleveland Indians announcers
College basketball announcers in the United States
College football announcers
Los Angeles City College alumni
Los Angeles Rams announcers
Major League Baseball broadcasters
Major League Baseball public address announcers
National Basketball Association broadcasters
National Football League announcers
National Basketball Association public address announcers
National Football League public address announcers
New Jersey Nets announcers
New York Jets announcers
New York Yankees announcers
New York Yankees personnel
Philadelphia Eagles announcers
Sportspeople from Los Angeles
Tampa Bay Rays announcers
Susan Miller Dorsey High School alumni
21st-century African-American people
20th-century African-American people